Cleveland is an unincorporated community in Jackson Township, Hancock County, Indiana.

History
Cleveland was originally called Portland, and under the latter name was laid out and platted in 1834. The community was renamed Cleveland in 1855.

A post office was established as Cleveland in 1852, and remained in operation until it was discontinued in 1903.

Geography

References

Unincorporated communities in Hancock County, Indiana
Unincorporated communities in Indiana
Indianapolis metropolitan area